Josh Whidborne (born 18 September 1989) is an English ice dancer who represents Great Britain. With his partner Charlotte Aiken, he is the 2012 Ondrej Nepela Memorial bronze medalist and 2012 British national silver medalist.

Career 
Whidborne teamed up with Charlotte Aiken in 2008, after each won the British solo ice dance championships (what level?). They are coached by John Dunn at Lee Valley in London. They are the 2009/10 and 2010/11 Welsh and British junior ice dance champions. They were members of Deeside Ice Skating Club and Ice Skate Wales. In 2009, they made the decision to relocate to Deeside, North Wales to train with coach Joan Slater MBE and with 2002 Olympian Marika Humphreys-Baranova as their choreographer. In January 2011, they relocated to Madrid, Spain, to train with John Dunn. In 2012, John Dunn relocated with his students back to the UK

In the 2012–2013 season, Aiken and Whidborne won their first senior international medal, bronze at the 2012 Ondrej Nepela Memorial. They then won the silver medal at the 2012 British Championships.

Programs 
(with Aiken)

Results 
(with Aiken)

References

External links 

 

English male ice dancers
1989 births
Living people
Sportspeople from Reading, Berkshire